Beduru (also known as Bedura) is a longhouse in the Saratok division of Sarawak, Malaysia.

Neighbouring settlements include:

References

Villages in Sarawak